Volcano Peak is a summit in the U.S. state of Nevada.

Volcano Peak was so named on account of volcanic rock near the summit.

References

Mountains of Mineral County, Nevada